Roomzzz Aparthotels is a hotel company based in Leeds, England. It has 10 sites across 7 cities, in the United Kingdom as of February 2021. Roomzzz has re-developed various historical buildings across the United Kingdom.

References

External links 
 Official website

Hotels established in 2006
2006 establishments in the United Kingdom
Hotel chains in the United Kingdom
British brands